The International Psychoanalytical Association (IPA) is an association including 12,000 psychoanalysts as members and works with 70 constituent organizations. It was founded in 1910 by Sigmund Freud, from an idea proposed by Sándor Ferenczi.

History 

In 1902 Sigmund Freud started to meet every week with colleagues to discuss his work, thus establishing the Psychological Wednesday Society. By 1908 there were 14 regular members and some guests including Max Eitingon, Carl Jung, Karl Abraham, and Ernest Jones, all future Presidents of the IPA. The Society became the Vienna Psychoanalytical Society.

In 1907 Jones suggested to Jung that an international meeting should be arranged. Freud welcomed the proposal. The meeting took place in Salzburg on April 27, 1908. Jung named it the "First Congress for Freudian Psychology".  It is later reckoned to be the first International Psychoanalytical Congress. Even so, the IPA had not yet been founded.

The IPA was established at the next Congress held at Nuremberg in March 1910. Its first President was Carl Jung, and its first Secretary was Otto Rank. Sigmund Freud considered an international organization to be essential to advance his ideas. In 1914 Freud published a paper entitled The History of the Psychoanalytic Movement.

The IPA is the international accrediting and regulatory body for member organisations. The IPA's aims include creating new psychoanalytic groups, conducting research, developing training policies and establishing links with other bodies. It organizes a biennial Congress.

Regional organizations 

There is a Regional Organisation for each of the IPA’s 3 regions:
 Europe—European Psychoanalytical Federation (or EPF), which also includes Australia, India, Israel, Lebanon, South Africa and Turkey; 
The IPA is incorporated in England, where it is a company limited by guarantee and also a registered charity. Its administrative offices are at The Lexicon in Central London.
 Latin America—Federation of Psychoanalytic Societies of Latin America (or FEPAL);
 North America—North American Psychoanalytic Confederation (or NAPSAC), which also includes Japan and Korea.
Each of these three bodies consists of Constituent Organisations and Study Groups that are part of that IPA region. The IPA has a close working relationship with each of these independent organisations, but they are not officially or legally part of the IPA.

Constituent organizations 
The IPA's members qualify for membership by being a member of a "constituent organisation" (or the sole regional association).

Constituent Organisations

Provisional Societies 

 Guadalajara Psychoanalytic Association (Provisional Society)
 Moscow Psychoanalytic Society (Provisional Society)
 Psychoanalytic Society for Research and Training (Provisional Society)
 Vienna Psychoanalytic Association

Regional associations 

 American Psychoanalytic Association ("APsaA") is a body which has in membership societies which cover around 75% of psychoanalysts in the United States of America (the remainder are members of "independent" societies which are in direct relationship with the IPA).

IPA Study Groups 

"Study Groups" are bodies of analysts which have not yet developed sufficiently to be a freestanding society, but that is their aim.

Campinas Psychoanalytical Study Group
Center for Psychoanalytic Education and Research
Croatian Psychoanalytic Study Group
Fortaleza Psychoanalytic Group
Goiania Psychoanalytic Nucleus
Korean Psychoanalytic Study Group
Latvia and Estonia Psychoanalytic Study Group
Lebanese Association for the Development of Psychoanalysis
Minas Gerais Psychoanalytical Study Group
Northern Ireland Psychoanalytic Society
Portuguese Nucleus of Psychoanalysis
Psychoanalytical Association of Asuncion SG
South African Psychoanalytic Association
Study Group of Turkey: Psike Istanbul
Turkish Psychoanalytical Group
Vermont Psychoanalytic Study Group
Vilnius Society of Psychoanalysts

Allied Centres 

"Allied Centres" are groups of people with an interest in psychoanalysis, in places where there are not already societies or study groups.

 Korean Psychoanalytic Allied Centre
 Psychoanalysis Studying Centre in China
 Taiwan Centre for The Development of Psychoanalysis
 The Centre for Psychoanalytic Studies of Panama

International Congresses 
The first 23 Congresses of IPA did not have a specific theme.

Criticism 
In 1975, Erich Fromm questioned this organization and found that the psychoanalytic association was "organized according to standards rather dictatorial". 

In 1999, Elisabeth Roudinesco noted that the IPA's attempts to professionalize psychoanalysis had become "a machine to manufacture significance". She also said that in France, "Lacanian colleagues looked upon the IPA as bureaucrats who had betrayed psychoanalysis in favour of an adaptive psychology in the service of triumphant capitalism". She wrote of the "IPA['s] Legitimist Freudianism, as mistakenly called  "orthodox" ". Among Roudinesco's other criticisms, was her reference to "homophobia" in the IPA, considered a "disgrace of psychoanalysis.

On the other hand, most criticisms laid against the IPA tend to come from a 1950s Lacanian point of view, unaware of recent developments, and of the variety of schools and training models within the association in recent decades. One of the three training models in the IPA (the French Model), is mostly due to Lacan's ideas and their perspectives regarding the training.

See also 
Columbia University Center for Psychoanalytic Training and Research

References

External links 
 

Freudian psychology
International organisations based in London
Organizations established in 1910
Psychoanalysis organizations